Jack Barton Adkisson Sr. (August 16, 1929 – September 10, 1997), better known by his ring name Fritz Von Erich, was an American professional wrestler, wrestling promoter, and the patriarch of the Von Erich family. He was a 3-time world champion and a record 20-time NWA United States Champion. He was also the owner of the World Class Championship Wrestling territory.

Football career
Adkisson attended Southern Methodist University, where he threw discus and played football.  He has been reported to have played with the now defunct Dallas Texans of the NFL (not the AFL team which became the Kansas City Chiefs), but this is not true. He was signed as a guard but was cut. He then tried the Canadian Football League (CFL).

Professional wrestling career

Early career and training
While in Edmonton, he met legendary wrestler and trainer Stu Hart, and Hart decided to train and book him in his Klondike Wrestling promotion, naming him Fritz Von Erich and teaming him with "brother" Waldo Von Erich as a pair of "evil German" brothers. Adkisson's oldest son Jack Barton Adkisson Jr. was born September 21, 1952. He died in 1959 after an accidental electrocution and drowning, and Jack Sr. stopped traveling to the east coast, allowing former partner Waldo to use the Von Erich name in the World Wide Wrestling Federation.

1960s
Despite Jack Jr.'s death, Adkisson continued to travel and wrestle. Adkisson won both versions of the AWA World title in 1963. His major circuit was Sam Muchnick's NWA territorial stronghold in St. Louis, Missouri. He wrestled there until 1967, when he voluntarily left the territory after losing a match for the NWA World Heavyweight Championship against then-champion Gene Kiniski.  In the late 1960s, with Muchnick's backing, Adkisson became the promoter for the Dallas territory, effectively overseeing the Houston and San Antonio territories, as well.

Japan
Adkisson was a part of rebuilding Japanese wrestling after the stabbing death of Rikidōzan. He became a star due to his feuds with Antonio Inoki and Giant Baba, and his "Iron Claw" hold, which became one of the most popular wrestling moves in Japan.

Retirement
In 1982, he held his first retirement match against King Kong Bundy in the newly renamed World Class Championship Wrestling promotion, based in Dallas. The promotion was known for its high production values, use of entrance music and the use of television syndication. The promotion was one of the most successful territories in the United States, with major draws like his sons, The Fabulous Freebirds, Chris Adams, Abdullah the Butcher, Bruiser Brody, Gino Hernandez and Rick Rude. He wrestled his last match on November 27, 1986 defeating Abdullah the Butcher by disqualification in Dallas. By the end of the 1980s, the promotion's talent pool was thin and it was eventually merged with Jerry Jarrett's Continental Wrestling Association to create the United States Wrestling Association in 1989.

Personal life and death

Adkisson married Doris J. Smith on June 23, 1950. Together, they had six sons: Jack Barton Jr. (September 21, 1952 – March 7, 1959), Kevin (born May 15, 1957), David (July 22, 1958 – February 10, 1984), Kerry (February 3, 1960 – February 18, 1993), Mike (March 2, 1964 – April 12, 1987) and Chris (September 30, 1969 – September 12, 1991). Of Adkisson's six sons, Kevin was the only one still living by the time Adkisson died. The couple later separated and Doris divorced her husband on July 21, 1992 after 42 years of marriage.

Adkisson died of brain and lung cancer on September 10, 1997. His funeral service was held at the First Baptist Church in Dallas, Texas. His body was cremated with his ashes interred in the same plot as his fourth son, Kerry.

Championships and accomplishments
All Japan Pro Wrestling
NWA International Tag Team Championship (1 time) - with Karl Krupp
Big Time Wrestling
NWA United States Heavyweight Championship (Detroit Version) (3 times)
Maple Leaf Wrestling
NWA Canadian Open Tag Team Championship (3 times) - with Karl Von Schober (2) and Gene Kiniski (1)
Mid-Atlantic Championship Wrestling
NWA Southern Tag Team Championship (Mid-Atlantic version) (1 time) - with Waldo Von Erich
NWA Minneapolis Wrestling and Boxing Club / American Wrestling Association
AWA World Heavyweight Championship (1 time)
NWA World Tag Team Championship (Minneapolis version) (1 time) - with Hans Hermann
World Heavyweight Championship (Omaha) (2 times)
NWA Western States Sports
NWA International Tag Team Championship (Amarillo version) (1 time) - with Killer Karl Krupp
NWA North American Heavyweight Championship (Amarillo version) (4 times)
NWA World Tag Team Championship (Amarillo version) (1 time) - with Gene Kiniski
Pro Wrestling Illustrated
Ranked No. 207 of the top 500 singles wrestlers of the "PWI Years" in 2003
Professional Wrestling Hall of Fame
Class of 2012
Southwest Sports, Inc / NWA Big Time Wrestling / World Class Championship Wrestling
NWA American Heavyweight Championship (13 times)
NWA American Tag Team Championship (7 times) - with Waldo Von Erich (2), Billy Red Lyons (1), Grizzly Smith (1), Fred Curry (1), Dan Miller (1), and Dean Ho (1)
NWA Brass Knuckles Championship (Texas version) (5 times)
NWA Texas Heavyweight Championship (4 times)
NWA United States Heavyweight Championship (Texas version) (3 times)
NWA World Six-Man Tag Team Championship (Texas version) (1 time) - with Kevin & Mike Von Erich
NWA World Tag Team Championship (Texas Version) (2 times) - with Killer Karl Kox (1) and Duke Keomuka (1)
Stampede Wrestling
Alberta Tag Team Championship (2 times) - with Lou Sjoberg
St. Louis Wrestling Hall of Fame
Class of 2007
WWE
WWE Hall of Fame (Class of 2009)
Wrestling Observer Newsletter
Most Disgusting Promotional Tactic (1985) Usage of Mike Von Erich near death to sell tickets
Most Disgusting Promotional Tactic (1986) Exploitation of the death of Gino Hernandez in a video package about Chris Adams blindness angle
Most Disgusting Promotional Tactic (1987) Exploitation of the death of Mike Von Erich
Most Disgusting Promotional Tactic (1988) Fake heart attack angle
Wrestling Observer Newsletter Hall of Fame (Class of 1996)

See also

List of notable brain tumor patients
Von Erich family

Notes

References

Further reading

External links
 
 

1929 births
1997 deaths
20th-century American male actors
American football offensive linemen
American male professional wrestlers
American United Methodists
AWA World Heavyweight Champions
Dallas Texans (NFL) players
Deaths from brain cancer in the United States
Deaths from cancer in Texas
Deaths from lung cancer
Faux German professional wrestlers
Fictional Nazis
People from Denton, Texas
People from Jewett, Texas
Professional wrestlers from Texas
Professional Wrestling Hall of Fame and Museum
Professional wrestling promoters
Professional wrestling trainers
SMU Mustangs football players
Southern Methodists
Von Erich family
WWE Hall of Fame inductees
Stampede Wrestling alumni
20th-century Methodists
20th-century professional wrestlers
WCWA Brass Knuckles Champions
NWA Canadian Open Tag Team Champions
NWA Canadian Tag Team Champions (Calgary version)
NWA International Tag Team Champions